A double referendum was held in Transnistria on 17 September 2006. Voters were asked whether they approved of the possibility of renouncing independence and integration with Moldova, or alternatively independence and a possible future integration into the Russian Federation.

Background
Pro-Moldovan organisations announced before the referendum that they would not recognise its results. Ballots for the referendum were reprinted three times, as the chairman of electoral commission, Piotr Denisenko, announced a shrinkage of electorate of 7% compared with previous year.

Results

Renouncing independence and potential future integration into Moldova

Independence and potential future integration into Russia

Of  the total of 394,861 registered voters, the voter turnout was 78.6%, substantially more than the 50%+1 required by law to validate the referendum.
On the day of the referendum, no exit polling was allowed within 25 meters of polling stations, to prevent disruption of voting.

Reactions 

International organisations, such as the Organisation for Economic Co-operation and Development, European Union, GUAM, and some other countries (Ukraine, Romania, Bulgaria, Turkey, Serbia, Macedonia, Croatia, Montenegro, Bosnia, Albania, Norway, Iceland) did not recognise the referendum.

According to Russian News Agency RIA Novosti, more than 130 international observers monitored the referendum and reported that "they did not register any procedural violations during the secret balloting", and the representative of the Congress of Russian Communities from Moldova declared that the referendum was held according to international standards. However, no internationally recognised monitoring organisations had observers present.

Viktor Alksnis, a deputy from the Russian party "Rodina" stated that referendum in Transnistria was held without any violations of legislation and democratic standards.
Viktor Alksnis is known to have previously described the Transnistrian Republic as the base from which the Soviet Union's restoration would begin.

In the opinion of the Ukrainian foreign ministry, the situation in Transnistria fails to meet the conditions of a free will expression by citizens.

According to the OSCE, the media climate in the Transdniestrian region is restrictive, as authorities there continue a long-standing campaign to silence independent opposition voices and movements.
Although the OSCE decided not to send any observers to monitor the referendum, 130 observers from CIS and Europe and from eleven election monitoring organizations who did attend the referendum had different reactions.

In contrast, the Helsinki Committee for Human Rights in Moldova (HCHRM) claims to have observed a series of infringements at the referendum:

 Groups of activists going into people's homes, especially in Tiraspol and Bender districts, asking why they did not come to the referendum, and threatening that after the referendum they will be forced to look for a new home in Romania.
 At some voting stations agents dressed in civil or militia uniforms forcing the observers from outside the sections to stay at a distance of 200–250 meters far from these places.
 "Cleaning" of the list of voters by excluding some citizens who previously boycotted elections and referendums held in Transnistria.
 "Electoral tourism" and multiple voting 

Karel De Gucht (Chairman of the OSCE) expressed an opinion about the "lack of basic requirements for free and fair elections, such as freedom of the media, freedom of assembly and political pluralism, in the region pre-determined the results" and argued that the questions in the referendum are suggestively worded. In a possible manipulation of the public opinion, people are asked to choose between freedom ("free association") and loss of independence ("renounce the Transnistria's independent status"), between reality ("support the course") and possibility ("consider it possible") This formulation could have resulted in a response bias.

Victor Josu, deputy editor-in-chief of Russian-language Moldovan newspaper Moldavskiye Vedomosti, an accredited observer, described the referendum as a successful public relations action (regardless of violations and a lack of recognition) and reported favorably on a comparison between "recognized Chişinau" and "unrecognized Tiraspol" in an article which emphasized the openness, transparency and glasnost of the referendum process.

Sergei Bagapsh, president of Abkhazia (Abkhazia claims independence from Georgia, but has a disputed status), has said his republic "supports the aspirations of Transniestria toward independence and its choice of unification with Russia."

See also 
Elections in Transnistria
Human rights in Transnistria
Politics of Transnistria
Proposed Russian annexation of Transnistria

References

External links
 "International observer: Referendum in Transdnestr conforms to international norms" Regnum News
 "Moldova's Trans-Dniester Votes in Referendum on Whether to Pursue Independence" Voice of America News
 Transdnestr independence plebiscite RIA Novosti
 OSCE reaction
 Final monitoring report by international observers
 Transdniester Conflict Was Long In The Making Radio Free Europe

Transnistria
Referendums in Transnistria
Separatism in Moldova
Transnistria conflict
Transnistria, 2006 referendum
2006 elections in Moldova
2006 in Transnistria
2006 in international relations